The Bengoechea Hotel was founded in 1910 by Jose Bengoechea. The building is a focal point of Basque American culture in Mountain Home, Idaho. The Bengochea Hotel and its surrounding area are known as "The Bengoechea Block". In June 2007 the building was sold to Mirazim Shakoori who plans on restoring the building to its original condition for the 100th anniversary in 2010.

References 

 National Register of Historic Places
  8:15-15:00 tape 3 side 1

Basque-American history
Basque-American culture in Idaho
Buildings and structures in Elmore County, Idaho
Hotel buildings on the National Register of Historic Places in Idaho
Hotel buildings completed in 1910
National Register of Historic Places in Elmore County, Idaho
Mountain Home, Idaho